Baphetes is an extinct genus of tetrapod from the Pennine Coal Measures Group and Parrot Coal, England, the Joggins Formation of Nova Scotia, and the Kladno Formation of the Czech Republic. It was first named by Richard Owen in 1854. The type species is B. planiceps.

References

External links 
 Baphetes in the Paleobiology Database

Baphetoids
Carboniferous tetrapods
Carboniferous tetrapods of Europe
Paleozoic life of Nova Scotia
Fossil taxa described in 1854
Taxa named by Richard Owen